Anton Salvesen  (born 24 October 1927)  is a Norwegian luger who competed in the 1950s. At the inaugural event at the FIL World Luge Championships in Oslo in 1955, he won the gold medal in the men's singles event.

References
Hickok sports information on World champions in luge and skeleton.

Norwegian male lugers
Possibly living people
1927 births